This is a list of Armenian churches in Iran. Today there are more about 200 Armenian temples in modern Iran territory.

Tehran

New Julfa, Isfahan

Northern Iran

West Azerbaijan

Salmas

Urmia

Khoy

Maku

Miandoab

East Azerbaijan

Tabriz

Julfa (Jolfa)

Other Cities

See also 
 Armenian Iranians
 New Julfa

References 

 
 

 
Oriental Orthodoxy-related lists
Lists of religious buildings and structures in Iran
Lists of churches